Atanas Atanasov is a Bulgarian lawyer and politician. He was a former member of the UDF (2002-2004), DSB (since 2004), Secretary of the Minister of Interior (1997-1998), and a director of SANS (1999). He is an MP.

Biography 
Atanasov was born on 17 May 1959 at Batin, Ruse, Bulgaria. He graduated from Sofia University. He worked as a judge in Ruse (1987-1988) and a prosecutor in Razgrad (1989-1992). From 1992 to 1995, Atanasov was the regional director of Minister of Interior at Razgrad. He became a lawyer.

In 1997, Atanasov briefly became the Secretary of the Minister of Interior. He was also the director of the SANS for a year. He resigned from the post of Secretary and he became the director of the SANS. He became a Major General. He began to be in politics. On 10 December 1999, he provided Kostov a list of 226 people who were corrupt. 
Due to this, ten of the ministers were fired, including Bogomil Bonev, Mario Tagarinski, and Alexander Bozhkov. On 5 December 2001, his list was quoted on a presidential debate, leading many to not support him.

On 14 December 2001, he resigned as the director of the SANS. He then was involved in public activities. He was a member of the Dialog Club, which later became the DSB (2004). He was a MP for the DSB (2005-2009). Since 2006, he has been the regional chairman of the DSB in Sofia. He became the chairman of the DSB since June 10, 2017.

In 2009, Atanasov did not have a seat yet, but he was appointed director of the Information Services AD until August 2010, being replaced by Dyankov. In 2011, he became a local councilman for Sofia, being part of the Blue Coalition. In October 2014, he became an MP from the Reformist Bloc.

He was chairman of the DSB since 10 June 2017.

On 12 April 2018, as chairman, he co-founded an electoral alliance called Democratic Bulgaria. He was elected as the deputy speaker of the 45th and the 46th National Assembly.

External links 
 „До месец съдът се произнася по делото срещу Атанасов“  – vsekiden.com, 2 април 2007
 Атанас Петров Атанасов на сайта на 40 НС
 „Като кадрови офицер в НСС Алексей Петров е бил назначен през 2001 г. по предложение на Атанас Атанасов“ – Днес +, 23 април 2010

See also 
July 2021 Bulgarian parliamentary election

References 

Living people
1959 births
20th-century Bulgarian lawyers
Bulgarian politicians
21st-century Bulgarian politicians
Government ministers of Bulgaria
Union of Democratic Forces (Bulgaria) politicians